Our Huge Adventure is a 2005 American interactive animated musical adventure film produced by The Baby Einstein Company and Curious Pictures. It was first released direct-to-video on August 23, 2005. The film was followed by and serves as the pilot of the TV series Little Einsteins.

When it later aired on Playhouse Disney, the movie was split in half as two episodes at the end of Little Einsteins' first season, with many scenes of the original cut being edited out or shortened to fit the show's runtime.

As a requirement for the use of the Einstein name and trademark, the Baby Einstein Company paid royalties to Corbis, which acts on behalf of the estate of physicist Albert Einstein  ("Einstein" & “Albert Einstein” being licensed trademarks of The Hebrew University of Jerusalem).

Plot

Part 1: A Brand New Outfit
The Little Einsteins are on their daily patrol on Rocket, until they hear music coming from somewhere distant. After following the sound of the music, they reach a large wheat field. Hiding in a toadstool, shrouded in a column of shrubs is a Monarch Butterfly caterpillar. Seemingly enough, the caterpillar is excited, because she is going to change into a Monarch Butterfly at a tree known as the Musical Tree of Many Colors, a tree that harbors caterpillars that are entering their transformation state. Alongside other caterpillars, this caterpillar must go to this aforementioned tree via a green pickup truck. After a few instant, the truck hits a roadblock, causing the caterpillar to fall. The team then offers their help to the caterpillar, giving it a special seat on Rocket. Along the way they must traverse a Musical Rollercoaster, collect yellow leaves to feed the caterpillar along the road, and venture through a dangerous ocean. After reaching the musical tree of many colors, the caterpillar manages to merge into a grown Monarch Butterfly, much to everyone’s delight.

Part 2: The Missing Invitation
Right after the butterfly’s transformation, the team gets 4 invitations to a migration party of a dynasty of Monarch Butterflies in Mexico. Unfortunately, the newly created butterfly’s invitation is missing somewhere, much to the team’s dismay but also to the delight of some bullies that did get their invitations and teased the newborn butterfly. Once again, it’s up to the quartet to go forth and find the invitation to the party before it begins. After a risky adventure across the United States, the team reaches a cave in Oklahoma which may be a possible lead to the invitation, however, much to everyone’s horror, the cave is flooded in bats and arachnids, after giving chase to a horde of bats, two monarch butterflies are found ensnared inside a spider web, which turns out to be a Great King Spider’s dinner. It also turns out that the two butterflies knew the one with the team. After untangling them, the apex spider gives chase, along with another horde of bloodthirsty bats. Fortunately, the crew and the butterflies manage to escape the cavern unharmed. Finally, after looking around some more, the invitation is found, burrowed within an abandoned mailbox in a field of cows in Houston, Texas. Grateful, the team flies to Mexico for the party. After presenting their invitations, the two other butterflies saved in the cavern recognize the team’s butterfly, and honor it by giving it a medal for its audacity and the perseverance to strive for its family’s wellbeing and legacy.
Once again, the day is saved by the heroes, and the butterfly is able to reunite, unharmed and safe with its new family.

Voice cast
Jesse Schwartz as Leo
Erica Huang as June
Aiden Pompey as Quincy
Natalia Wójcik as Annie

Singing voices
Harrison Chad
Jesse Goldberg
Emma Straus
Philip Trencher

References

External links

 
 

2005 films
2005 direct-to-video films
2005 fantasy films
2000s musical films
American flash animated films
American children's animated adventure films
American children's animated fantasy films
American children's animated musical films
2000s children's fantasy films
Disney direct-to-video animated films
Animated films about children
Animated films about insects
Films set in Mexico
2000s English-language films
2000s American films